Strategic Homeport was a plan developed in the 1980s by Secretary of the Navy John Lehman for building new U.S. Navy bases within the continental United States.  It was proposed as part of the 600-ship Navy plan of the Reagan Administration.  It called for the construction of new ports for existing and newly commissioned ships.
The plan was based on five strategic principles:
force dispersal to complicate Soviet targeting
battlegroup integrity
wider industrial base utilization
logistics suitability
geographic considerations such as reduced transit times to likely operating areas

The program was devised in part to achieve a political goal: to build support for the naval expansion program though the promise of new naval bases.

The program enjoyed broad support both in Congress and in the Reagan Administration.

Stations
Stations opened under the program include:
Naval Station Everett, Everett, Washington
Naval Station Galveston, Galveston, Texas
Naval Station Ingleside, Ingleside, Texas
Naval Station Lake Charles, Lake Charles, Louisiana
Naval Station Mobile, Mobile, Alabama
Naval Station New York, Staten Island, New York
Naval Station Pascagoula, Pascagoula, Mississippi

References

Cold War military history of the United States
United States Navy